The 2005 LG Cup was an exhibition association football tournament that took place in Egypt. The hosts won the tournament after beating Senegal 4–2 in the final.

Participants
Kenya were originally invited, but the invitation was withdrawn by the organizers due to the internal wranglings in the KFF (with two groups claiming its leadership, both appointing a different coach) and instead, they replaced them with Uganda. The participants were:

Results

Semifinals

Third place match

Final

Statistics

Goalscorers

See also
LG Cup

References

External links
Results

International association football competitions hosted by Egypt
2005–06 in African football by country
2005–06 in Egyptian football
2005 in Ecuadorian football